Gowrun (also Romanized as Gowrūn; also known as Gabrān, Gebrān, and Jowrān) is a village in Sarbanan Rural District, in the Central District of Zarand County, Kerman Province, Iran. At the 2006 census, its population was 18, in 5 families.

References 

Populated places in Zarand County